

S
Saint Tropez
"On A Rien A Perdre" (1977), "Hold on to Love" (1978), "Fill My Life with Love" (1978), "One More Minute" (1979)
The Salsoul Orchestra
"Tangerine" (1975), "Nice 'n' Naasty" (1976), "You're Just the Right Size" (1976), "Chicago Bus Stop (Ooh, I Love It)" (1976), "Christmas Medley" (1976), "Run Away" (1977)
Queen Samantha
"The Letter" (1978), "Close Your Eyes" (1979), "Take a Chance" (1979)
Samantha Sang
"Emotion" (1978), "You Keep Me Dancing" (1978), "From Dance To Love" (1979)
Véronique Sanson
"Bernard's Song (Il N'est De Nulle Part)" (1977)
Santa Esmeralda
"Don't Let Me Be Misunderstood" (1977), "Sevilla Nights" (1977), "Another Cha-Cha" (1978)
Santana
"One Chain (Don't Make No Prison)" (1978)
Sarah Brightman & Hot Gossip
"I Lost My Heart To A Starship Trooper" (1978), "Adventures Of The Love Crusader" (1979)
Leo Sayer
"You Make Me Feel Like Dancing" (1977), "Thunder in My Heart" (1978)
Boz Scaggs
"What Can I Say?" (1976), "Lowdown" (1976), "Hollywood" (1977), "Hard Times" (1977), "Jo Jo" (1980), "Simone" (1980), "Miss Sun" (1980)
Harvey Scales
"Follow the Disco Crowd" (1977), "Hot Foot" (1979)
Lalo Schifrin
"Enter The Dragon" (1973), "Ape Shuffle" (1974)
Gloria Scott
"Just as Long as We're Together" (1975)
Ambros Seelos
"Gimme More" (1979)
Shalamar
"The Second Time Around" (1979), "A Night To Remember (1982), "There It Is" (1982), "I Can Make You Feel Good" (1982), "Dancing In The Sheats" (1984)
Marlena Shaw
"It's Better Than Walkin' Out" (1976), "Love Dancin'" (1979), "Touch Me in the Morning" (1979)
Sheila and B. Devotion
"Spacer" (1979)
Shirley & Company
"Shame, Shame, Shame" (1974)
Bunny Sigler
"By the Way You Dance" (1978), "Love Song" (duet with Barbara Mason) (1979)
Silver Convention
"Fly Robin Fly" (1975), "Get Up and Boogie"  (1976)
Bebu Silvetti (Silvetti)
"Primitive Man" (1976), "Spring Rain" (1977), "Sun after the Rain" (1978)
Joe Simon
"Get Down, Get Down (Get On The Floor)" (1975), "Love Vibration" (1978), "Going Through These Changes" (1978), "One Step at a Time" (1978), "Happy Birthday, Baby" (1979)
Lowrell Simon (Lost Generation)
"Mellow, Mellow Right On" (1978), "Overdose of Love" (1979)
Frank Sinatra
"Night and Day" (1977)
Julie Sitruk (Chantal Curtis)
"Un Païs Tropical" (1978)
Sister Sledge
"He's The Greatest Dancer" (1979), "We Are Family" (1979), "Thinking Of You" (1978), "Lost In Music" (1979), "Got To Love Somebody" (1979), "All American Girls" (1981)
Skyy
"First Time Around" (1979), "Disco Dancing" (1979), "Call Me" (1982)
Slave
"Slide" (1977), "Stellar Fungk" (1978), "Just A Touch Of Love" (1979), "Watching You" (1980)
Percy Sledge
"When She's Touching Me" (1977)
O.C. Smith
"You Thrill Me" (1979)
Snuky Tate
"He's The Groove" (1979)
Gino Soccio
"Dance to Dance" (1979), "Dancer" (1979), "Try It Out" (1981)
Sophisticated Ladies
"Check It Out" (1977)
S.O.S. Band
"Take Your Time (Do It Right)" (1980), "Just Be Good To Me" (1983), "Finest" (1986), "Borrowed Love" (1986), "Sands Of Time" (1986)
Soul Children
"Summer in the Shade" (1978)
Soul Survivors
"Tonight's The Night" (1975), "Happy Birthday, America" (1976), "Right Here Right Now" (1977)
Soul Train Gang
"Soul Train Theme" (1976), "Ooh Cha Cha" (1976), "My Cherie Amour" (1977)
Space(France)
"Carry on, Turn Me On" (1977), "Magic Fly" (1977), "Deliverance" (1978)
The Spinners
"Rubberband Man" (1976), "Love or Leave" (1975), "H.E.L.P." (1978), "Working My Way Back To You/Forgive Me Girl" (1979), "Disco Ride" (1979), "Cupid/I've Loved You For A Long Time" (1980)
King Sporty(Jamaica)
"Keep on Dancing" (1977), "Fire Keep on Burning" (1978)
Pamala Stanley
"This Is Hot" (1979), "All I Wanna Do Is Dance" (1979), "Hey Mr. Magic" (1979), "I Don't Want To Talk About It" (1983), "If Looks Could Kill" (1983), "Coming Out Of Hiding" (1984)
Mavis Staples
"Tonight I Feel Like Dancing" (1979)
Stargard
"Disco Rufus" (1978), "Which Way Is Up" (1978), "Wear It Out" (1979)
Edwin Starr
"Contact" (1978), "H.A.P.P.Y. Radio" (1979)
Ringo Starr
"Drowning in the Sea of Love" (1977), "Just A Dream" (1977), “Where Did Our Love Go” (1978)
Candi Staton
"Young Hearts Run Free" (1976), "Nights On Broadway" (1977), "Victim" (1978), "Honest I Do Love You" (1978), "When You Wake up Tomorrow" (1979), "Suspicious Minds" (1982)
Steely Dan
"Peg" (1977), "Home At Last" (1978), "Josie" (1978), "FM (No Static at All)", (1978), "Hey Nineteen" (1980)
Amii Stewart
"Knock On Wood" (1979), "Light My Fire/137 Disco Heaven" (1979), "Jealousy" (1979), "The Letter" (1979), "The Winner Takes All" (1979), "Step Into The Love Line" (1979), "Great Balls Of Fire" (1982), "Where Did Our Love Go" (1982), "Working Late Tonight" (1983), "Friends" (1985), "Stand" (1986), "Time Is Tight" (1986), "So Shy" (1992), "I Can't Give Up" (1992)
Rod Stewart
"Do Ya Think I'm Sexy?" (1978), "Young Turks" (1981)
Tommy Stewart (trumpeter)
"Bump And Hustle Music" (1976)
Street People
"Never Get Enough of Your Love" (1976), "Liberated Lady" (1977)
Barbra Streisand
"Shake Me, Wake Me (When It's Over)" (1975), "The Main Event/Fight" (1979), "No More Tears (Enough Is Enough)" (duet with Donna Summer) (1979)
The Stylistics
"Rockin' Roll Baby" (1973), "I Can't Give You Anything (But My Love) (1975), "Love Is The Answer" (1979), "Disco Baby" (1975), "Sixteen Bars" (1976), "Lucky Me" (1977), "The Lion Sleeps Tonight" (1978), "You're The Best Thing In My Life" (1978), "One-Night Affair" (1979), "Fly!" (1979)
Sunny
"Doctor's Orders" (1974)
Donna Summer
"Love To Love You Baby" (1975), "Could It Be Magic?" (1976),  "Try Me, I Know We Can Make It" (1976), "I Feel Love" (1977), "Loves Unkind" (1977), "Now I Need You" (1977), "Working The Midnight Shift", (1977), "Down Deep Inside" (1977), "I Love You" (1977), "Last Dance" (1978), "With Your Love" (1978), "MacArthur Park" (1978), "One Of A Kind" (1978), "Hot Stuff" (1979), "Bad Girls" (1979), "Our Love" (1979), "Sunset People" (1979), "Heaven Knows" (1979), "Dim All The Lights" (1979), "No More Tears (Enough Is Enough)" (Duet with Barbra Streisand) (1979), "On The Radio" (1980), "Love Is In Control (Finger On The Trigger)" (1982), "She Works Hard for the Money" (1983), "This Time I Know Its For Real" (1989)
Sunshine (USA)
"Take It to the Zoo" (1978)
The Supremes
"He's My Man" (1975), "I'm Gonna Let My Heart Do the Walking" (1976), "High Energy" (1976)
The Sylvers
"Boogie Fever" (1975), "Hot Line" (1976), "High School Dance" (1976), "Don't Stop, Get Off" (1978)
Sylvester
"Down, Down, Down" (1977), "Over and Over" (1977), "Dance (Disco Heat)" (1978), "You Make Me Feel (Mighty Real)" (1978), "I (Who Have Nothing)" (1979), "Can't Stop Dancing" (1979), "Stars" (1979), "Sell My Soul" (1980), "I'll Dance To That" (1980), "I Need You" (1980), "Fever" (1980), "Can't You See" (1981), "Do Ya Wanna Funk" (1982), "Menergy" (1982), "Trouble In Paradise" (1983), "Hard Up" (1983), "Call Me" (1983), "Don't Stop" (1983), "Take Me To Heaven" (1983), "Be With You" (1983), "Taking Love Into My Own Hands" (1983), "Lovin' Is Really My Game" (1983), "Living For The City" (1986), "Someone Like You" (1986)
Sylvia
"Pillow Talk" (1973), "The Lollipop Man" (1977), "Automatic Lover" (1977)
Syreeta
"One to One" (1977), "Loving You" (with Donald Byrd) (1979)

T
T-Connection
"Disco Magic" (1976), "Do What Ya Wanna Do" (1977), "Let Yourself Go" (1978), "Saturday Night" (1979), "At Midnight" (1979)
A Taste of Honey
"Boogie Oogie Oogie" (1978), "Disco Dancin'" (1978), "Do It Good" (1979), "Take The Boogae (Or Leave It)" (1979), "Rescue Me" (1980), "She's A Dancer" (1980)
Tavares
"It Only Takes A Minute" (1975), "Heaven Must Be Missing An Angel" (1976), "Don't Take Away The Music" (1976), "Whodunnit" (1977), "More Than A Woman" (1978), "Slow Train to Paradise" (1978)
Johnnie Taylor
"Disco Lady" (1976), "Love is Better in the AM" (1977), "Disco 9000" (1977), "Keep on Dancing" (1978), "Mister Melody-Maker" (1979)
Laura Taylor (Brazil)
"Dancin' in My Feet" (1978), "All Through Me" (1978), "Some Love" (1978), "Lady Scorpio" (1978)
Ted Taylor
"Ghetto Disco" (1977), "Keepin' My Head above Water" (1979)
Telex
"Moskow Diskow" (1979), "Twist à Saint Tropez" (1979), "Euro-Vision" (1980), "L'amour Toujours (1984)
The Temprees
"I Found Love on a Disco Floor" (1976)
Joe Tex
"Ain't Gonna Bump No More (With No Big Fat Woman)" (1977)
Evelyn Thomas
"I Wanna Make It on My Own" (1978), "Love In The First Degree" (1979), "High Energy" (1984), "Masquerade" (1984)
Tasha Thomas
"Hot-Buttered Boogie" (1979)
Timmy Thomas
"Touch to Touch" (1977), "Stone to the Bone" (1978), "Freak in, Freak Out" (1978)
Linda G. Thompson (Silver Convention)
"Ooh, What A Night" (1974), "Flight To Fantasy" (1980)
Three Degrees
"Dirty Old Man" (1973), "When Will I See You Again" (1974), "Take Good Care Of Yourself" (1975), "Giving Up Giving In" (1978), "Woman In Love" (1978), "The Runner" (1979), "The Golden Lady" (1979), "Jump The Gun" (1979), "My Simple Heart" (1979), "Hot Summer Night" (1979)
Harry Thumann (Disco)
"American Express" (1979), "Underwater" (1980)
Toto
"Georgy Porgy" (1978)
The Trammps
"Hold Back the Night" (1976), "That's Where the Happy People Go" (1976), "Disco Inferno" (1976), "Disco Party" (1976), "The Whole World's Dancing" (1978)
Joey Travolta
"What Did Love Ever Do for You?" (1979)
Roger Troutman
"Do it Roger" (1981)
Twenty One Pilots
"My Blood" (2018)
Two Man Sound (Belgium, Disco Samba)
"Que Tal America" (1978)

U
USA-European Connection
"Come Into My Heart/Good Loving" (1978)

V
Jerry Vale
"Toot, Toot, Tootsie (Goo' Bye!)" (1978)
Frankie Valli
"And That Reminds Me" (1969), (w/ The Four Seasons) "Who Loves You" (1975), (w/ The Four Seasons) "Swearin' to God" (1975), "Our Day Will Come" (1975), "December 1963 (Oh What a Night)" (w/ The Four Seasons) (1976), "Grease" (1978), "Passion for Paris" (1979), "Soul" (1980), "Heaven Above Me" (1980), "Let It Be Whatever It Is" (1980)
Luther Vandross (Luther 1976)
"It's Good for the Soul" (1976), "May Christmas Bring You Happiness" (1976), "Never Too Much" (1981), "Don't You Know That" (1981), "Sugar and Spice" (1981)
Sylvie Vartan
"Georges (Georges Disco Tango)" (1977)
Vaughn Mason & Crew
"Bounce, Rock, Skate, Roll" (1980)
Tata Vega
"I'm Just Thinking about You Baby" (1979), "Givin' All My Love" (1980), "There's Love In The World" (1980)
Venus Dodson
"Night Rider" (1979), "Shining" (1979), "He Said, She Said" (1979)
Village People
"San Francisco (You've Got Me)" (1977), "In Hollywood (Everybody Is a Star)" (1977), "Macho Man" (1978), "Y.M.C.A." (1978), "Go West" (1979), "In the Navy" (1979)
Voggue
"Back Again" (1981), "Dancing The Night Away" (1981), "Roller Boogie" (1981), "I Love To Dance" (1983)
Voyage
"Souvenirs" (1978), "From East to West/Scots Machine" (1978), "Let's Fly Away" (1979)

W
Narada Michael Walden
"I Shoulda Loved Ya" (1979), "Tonight I'm Alright" (1979), "Lovin' You Madly" (1979)
Anita Ward
"Ring My Bell" (1979), "Don't Drop My Love" (1979)
Jeanette Washington (P Funk)
"Turn Your Boogie Loose" (1979)
Johnny "Guitar" Watson
"Miss Frisco (Queen of the Disco)" (1978)
Bob Welch
"Precious Love" (1978)
The Whispers
"I Fell in Love Last Night (At the Disco)" (1976), "Make It with You" (1977), "Can't Do without Love" (1979), "And the Beat Goes On" (1979), "Rock Steady" (1987)
Barry White
"Love's Theme" (1973), **"I'm Gonna Love You Just A Little More Baby" (1973), "You're the First, the Last, My Everything" (1974), "Never Never Gonna Give You Up" (1974), "Can't Get Enough of Your Love, Babe" (1974), "I'll Do For You Anything You Want Me To" (1975), "What Am I Gonna Do With You" (1975), "You See The Trouble With Me" (1976), "Baby, We Better Try To Get It Together" (1976), "Let The Music Play" (1976), "Don't Make Me Wait Too Long" (1976), "I'm Qualified To Satisfy You" (1976), "It's Ecstasy When You Lay Down Next to Me" (1977), "Never Thought I'd Fall In Love With You" (1977), "Look At Her" (1978), "Your Sweetness Is My Weakness" (1978), "Sha La La (Means I Love You)" (1978), "Any Fool Could See (You Were Meant For Me)" (1979), "I Love to Sing the Songs I Sing" (1979), "Sheet Music" (1980)
Slim Whitman
"Cara Mia" (1977)
Andy Williams
"Love Story (Where Do I Begin)" disco version (1979)
Carol Williams
"Rattlesnake" (1975), "More" (1976), "Come Back" (1976), "Love Is You" (1977), "My time of need" (1977), "Love has come my way" (1978), "Dance the Night Away" (1979), "Tell the World All about Our Love" (1979)
Lenny Williams
"If You're in Need" (1979), "When I'm Dancing" (1979)
Viola Wills
"Gonna Get Along Without You Now" (1979), "If You Could Read My Mind" (1980), "Always Something There To Remind Me" (1980), "Up On The Roof" (1980), "Don't Ever Stop Loving Me" (1981), "Stormy Weather" (1982), "Both Sides Now" (1985)
Bobby Wilson 
"Deeper And Deeper" (1975)
Jackie Wilson
"It Only Happens When I Look At You" (1977)
Mary Wilson
"Red Hot" (1979), "You Make Me Feel So Good" (1979)
Wilton Place Street Band
"Disco Lucy" (1976), "Sweet, Sweet Baby Love" (1977), "Gonna Have a Party" (1977)
Wings
"Goodnight Tonight" (1979)
Bill Withers
"Lovely Day" (1977), "You've Got the Stuff" (1979)
Bobby Womack
"It's Party Time" (1978), "Trust Your Heart" (1978)
Stevie Wonder
"Superstition" (1972), "You Haven't Done Nothing" (1974), "I Wish" (1976), "Another Star" (1976), "All I Do" (1980), "I Ain't Gonna Stand For It" (1980), "Did I Hear You Say You Love Me" (1980), "Do I Do" (1982), "Part Time Lover" (1985)
Carol Woods
"I'm in Wonderland" (1977)
Nanette Workman
"Lady Marmelade" (1976), "Danser, Danser" (1976)
Norma Jean Wright
"Saturday" (1978), "Sorcerer" (1978), "High Society" (1979)

Y
Alka Yagnik (India)
"Tum Nahin Jaana" (1998)
"Weird Al" Yankovic
"Gotta Boogie" (1980)
John Paul Young
"Standing In The Rain" (1977), "Love Is In The Air" (1978), "The Day My Heart Caught Fire"
Karen Young
"Hot Shot" (1978)

Z
Zdravo
"Vikend fobija" (1978)
David Zed
"I Am a Robot" (1980), "R.O.B.O.T." (1980), "Ballarobot" (1983)
Zodiac
"Zodiac" (1980), "Pacific" (1980), "Provincial Disco" (1980)
Zulema
"Half of Your Heart" (1975), "Change" (1979)
Zzongo
"The Big Bamboo" (1976)

References